Vlachokerasia is a village in Arcadia, Peloponnese, Greece. It is located 22 km from Tripoli and at an altitude of 960 meters, in a region with cherry trees, chestnuts and apple trees, walnuts and plane trees. Many water mills and water jets serve not only Vlachokerasia but also the nearby villages such as Kerasea.  The place has always been inhabited. The ancient inhabitants, the Skyrites, were warriors. The findings of archaeological excavations from the area are housed in the Tegea Museum. It was the territory of Demeter, apparently because of the very fertile land. Some testimonials from past generations over time confirm that the ancient name of the village was Ion (Greek: Ιών )

In the 2011 census there were 414 residents.

Populated places in Arcadia, Peloponnese
Villages in Greece